Billy Worth Briggs III (born June 8, 1977 in Lubbock, Texas, United States) is an American independent musician and songwriter residing in McKinney, Texas. He has written numerous songs.

Career
"What I Need" (performed by The Briggs Brothers' Band) is featured in the 2006 film release, 29 Reasons to Run. The soundtrack for the movie is composed entirely of independent artists, and has been as equally recognized as the movie itself, winning the Director's Choice Gold Medal of Excellence for Best Impact of Music in a Feature Film at the 2006 Park City, Utah Film-Music Festival, and the Best Original Music Award at the 2006 Bare Bones International Film Festival.

References

External links 
 Official web site
 Local News Story from Lubbock, TX

1977 births
Living people
People from McKinney, Texas
Singer-songwriters from Texas
American rock singers
American male singer-songwriters
American rock songwriters
American rock musicians
American rock guitarists
American male guitarists
Guitarists from Texas
21st-century American guitarists
21st-century American male singers
21st-century American singers